Francisco Javier Valdés de Anda (born 19 October 1956) is a Mexican politician affiliated with the National Action Party. As of 2014 he served as Deputy of the LIX Legislature of the Mexican Congress representing Aguascalientes.

References

1956 births
Living people
Politicians from Aguascalientes
Members of the Chamber of Deputies (Mexico)
National Action Party (Mexico) politicians
Universidad Autónoma de San Luis Potosí alumni
Monterrey Institute of Technology and Higher Education alumni
21st-century Mexican politicians